Carlos Robson Gracie Sr. (born August 13, 1935) is the second son of Carlos Gracie. Gracie is a 9th degree red belt in Brazilian Jiu-Jitsu, affording him the title of Grandmaster.

Biography 
Robson Gracie learned martial arts from his father, Carlos Gracie, and his uncle Helio Gracie. In the 1950s, Robson competed in Vale Tudo competitions. His début mixed martial arts fight was against Artur Emidio in April 1957. During the fight Gracie submitted his opponent, but refused to release him until the referee pulled them apart. Despite his small stature, incidents like this were to characterise Gracie's professional life as a tenacious fighter. In the 1960s, Gracie served as a bodyguard to Leonel Brizola, the brother-in-law of the then President of Brazil, João Goulart. His political affiliations placed him under the scrutiny of the military regime, following the 1964 Brazilian coup d'état. His assistance to the Marxist guerrilla organisation Ação Libertadora Nacional led to his arrest, and the arrest of several members of his family, by the Brazilian Secret Service. Gracie's wife, Vera Lucia, made representations to the Brazilian military government to release her husband which resulted in her own arrest; however, she was quickly released.

Gracie currently lives and teaches in Rio de Janeiro, Brazil where he is the president of the Jiu-Jitsu Federation of Rio de Janeiro.

On 25 October 2018, shortly before the second round of the 2018 Brazilian general election, Robson Gracie handed an honorary black belt to the future President of Brazil, Jair Bolsonaro, who has never actually trained in jiu-jitsu.

References

Further reading 
Carlos Gracie: O Criador De Uma Dinastia, Relia Gracie, 2009,  

Sportspeople from Rio de Janeiro (city)
Brazilian practitioners of Brazilian jiu-jitsu
Brazilian jiu-jitsu trainers
Brazilian people of Scottish descent
Living people
1935 births
Robson
People awarded a red belt in Brazilian jiu-jitsu